Elizabeth Snyder (formerly known as Betsy Snyder) was an American television soap opera writer. She turned down the position of co-Head Writer of One Life to Live in November 2012.  That position was accepted by Thom Racina. Died November 16, 2021 at age 60.

Positions held
All My Children (hired by Ginger Smith & Marlene McPherson)
Co-Head Writer: April 29, 2013 – September 2, 2013 

Another World (hired by Michael Malone)
Breakdown Writer: 1996
Script Writer: 1995

The Bold and the Beautiful (CBS Daytime; hired by Bradley Bell)
Associate Head Writer: June 9, 2006 - January 21, 2008, April 16, 2008 - March 2010
Storyline Consultant: November 22, 2004 - June 8, 2006, December 21, 2009 - March 9, 2010

Dangerous Women (hired by Reg Watson)
Breakdown Writer: 1991

Days of Our Lives (hired by Christopher Whitesell)
Breakdown Writer: February 2011-August 2012, September 14, 2016 – 2021

General Hospital (ABC Daytime)(hired by Gene Palumbo)
Breakdown Writer: 1989 - 1993

Poor Nastya (Bednaya Nastya; suggested by Paul Rauch)
Co-Head Writer (2003 - 2004)

Port Charles (spin-off of GH; hired by Lynn Marie Latham)
Associate Head Writer: 1998 - 2000

Sunset Beach (NBC Daytime) (hired by Josh Griffith)
Breakdown Writer: January 6, 1997 – 1999

Awards and nominations
Snyder was nominated a total of seven times for a Daytime Emmy Award. She won in 2010 (shared with Bradley P. Bell, Head Writer; Kay Alden (ex HW of Y&R), Co-Head Writer; Michael Minnis, Co-Head Writer; Tracey Ann Kelly, Writer; Patrick Mulcahey; Rex M. Best; John F. Smith,; Adam Dusevoir; Shannon Bradley; Jerry Birn) and 2012.

Daytime Emmy Award
 Nomination, 2006 & 2010, Best Writing, The Bold and The Beautiful
 Nomination, 1996, Best Writing, Another World

Writers Guild of America Award
Nomination, 2011 season, DOOL
 Nomination, 1997 season, Sunset Beach
 Nomination, 1993 season, General Hospital

References

External links
 

American soap opera writers
American women television writers
Living people
Year of birth missing (living people)
Place of birth missing (living people)
Women soap opera writers
21st-century American women